Wabash Township Graded School, also known as Mecca High School and Mecca Grade School, is a historic school building located at Mecca, Parke County, Indiana. The main section was built in 1901 and expanded in 1910, and is a two-story, Richardsonian Romanesque style red brick building on a raise basement.  It has a hipped roof and limestone trim.  The main building features a bell tower over the main entrance. A gymnasium was added in 1923. The school closed in 1986.

It was added to the National Register of Historic Places in 1987.

It tragically caught fire on November 9,2022. Too soon to know what the cause or damage. Firefighters still on the scene as I add this.

References

School buildings on the National Register of Historic Places in Indiana
Richardsonian Romanesque architecture in Indiana
School buildings completed in 1901
Buildings and structures in Parke County, Indiana
National Register of Historic Places in Parke County, Indiana
1901 establishments in Indiana